Countess Jadwiga Maria Potocka (1899–1963) was a Polish noblewoman.

She was married to Stanisław Bohdan Grabiński, married to pianist then Polish Prime Minister Ignacy Jan Paderewski of Kraków till November 19, 1921 and to Andrzej Adam Potworowski since 1945. Her son Władysław Krzysztof fought and died in the Warsaw Uprising in 1944.

1899 births
1963 deaths
Jadwiga Maria